Topla Reber is a settlement in the Municipality of Kočevje in southern Slovenia. It incorporates both the former settlements of Dolnja Topla Reber and Gornja Topla Reber. It no longer has any permanent residents.

Name
The name Topla Reber literally means 'warm slope', referring to the geographical position of the settlement on a sun-exposed southwest-facing slope.

References

External links
Topla Reber on Geopedia

Populated places in the Municipality of Kočevje